Silvana Mangano (21 April 1930 – 16 December 1989) was an Italian film actress. She was one of a generation of thespians who arose from the neorealist movement, and went on to become a major female star, regarded as a sex symbol for the 1950s and '60s. She won the David di Donatello for Best Actress three times - for The Verona Trial (1963), The Witches (1967), and The Scientific Cardplayer (1973) - and the Nastro d'Argento for Best Actress twice.

Raised in poverty during World War II, Mangano trained as a dancer and worked as a model before winning a Miss Rome beauty pageant in 1946. This led to work in films; she achieved success in Bitter Rice (1949) and went on to forge a successful career in films, working with many notable directors like Pier Paolo Pasolini, Luchino Visconti, Alberto Lattuada, and Vittorio De Sica. Her career continued well into her 50s, with supporting roles in David Lynch's Dune (1984) and Nikita Mikhalkov Dark Eyes (1987).

Mangano was the wife of international film producer Dino De Laurentiis and had four children with him, including Veronica De Laurentiis and Raffaella De Laurentiis.

Early life
Born in Rome to an Italian father and an English mother (Ivy Webb from Croydon), Mangano lived in poverty during World War II. Trained for seven years as a dancer, she supported herself as a model.

In 1946, at age 16, Mangano won the Miss Rome beauty pageant, and through this, she obtained a role in a Mario Costa film. One year later, she became a contestant in the Miss Italia contest. The contest that year became a springboard for a pool of potential actresses, including the winner Lucia Bosé, Mangano, and several other future stars of Italian cinema such as Gina Lollobrigida, Eleonora Rossi Drago and Gianna Maria Canale.

Career
Mangano's earliest connection with filmmaking occurred through her romantic relationship with actor Marcello Mastroianni. This led her to a film contract, though it took some time for Mangano to ascend to international stardom with her performance in Bitter Rice (Riso Amaro, Giuseppe De Santis, 1949). She signed a contract with Lux Film in 1949, and later married producer Dino De Laurentiis.

Although she never had an international career to match her contemporaries Sophia Loren and Gina Lollobrigida, Mangano remained a favorite star between the 1950s and 1970s, appearing in Anna (Alberto Lattuada, 1951), L'oro di Napoli (Vittorio De Sica, 1954), Mambo (Robert Rossen, 1955), Teorema (Pier Paolo Pasolini, 1968), Death in Venice (Luchino Visconti, 1971), The Scientific Cardplayer (Luigi Comencini, 1972), and Ludwig (Luchino Visconti, 1973). She played the lead role in the 1967 anthology film The Witches, which featured segments directed by Pasolini, Visconti, De Sica, and Mauro Bolognini. She collaborated four times with Pasolini and Visconti.

Over the course of her career, Mangano won the David di Donatello for Best Actress three times and the Nastro d'Argento for Best Actress twice. Her final film role was in Nikita Mikhalkov for Dark Eyes, for which received a Nastro d'Argento nomination for Best Supporting Actress.

Although it was sung by Flo Sandon's, Silvana Mangano was credited on the record label of "El Negro Zumbón", which is from the soundtrack of the film Anna (1951) and was a hit song in 1953. A clip of the opening of this performance is featured in the film Cinema Paradiso (1988).

Personal life
It is claimed that she had affairs with Mohammad Reza Shah of Iran during the late 1940s. Married to film producer Dino De Laurentiis from 1949, the couple had four children: Veronica, Raffaella, Francesca, and Federico. Veronica's daughter Giada De Laurentiis is the host of Everyday Italian and Giada at Home on the Food Network. Raffaella co-produced with her father on Mangano's penultimate film, Dune (David Lynch, 1984). Federico died in an airplane crash in 1981 in Alaska. De Laurentiis and Mangano separated in 1983, and Mangano began divorce proceedings in 1988.

Death 
Following surgery on 4 December 1989 that left her in a coma, Mangano died of lung cancer in Madrid, Spain on 16 December 1989.

Legacy 
In 2000, the city of Rome named a street in the Vallerano district after Mangano.

Filmography

References

External links

 
 
 
 Front Cover of Life Magazine, 11 April 1960

1930 births
1989 deaths
Deaths from lung cancer in Spain
Italian film actresses
Italian people of English descent
Italian expatriates in Spain
Actresses from Rome
People of Sicilian descent
David di Donatello winners
Nastro d'Argento winners
20th-century Italian actresses
De Laurentiis family
Italian expatriates in the United States